Pseudomonas grimontii is a Gram-negative, rod-shaped, fluorescent, motile bacterium isolated from natural springs in France. The type strain is CIP 106645.

References

External links
Type strain of Pseudomonas grimontii at BacDive -  the Bacterial Diversity Metadatabase

Pseudomonadales
Bacteria described in 2002